Boris Trifonovich Apukhtin (19 February 1906 – 4 March 1975) was a Russian footballer and coach.

In 1916 he began his playing career at the Moscow team ZKS Moscow (Zamoskvorietsky Club of Sport). In 1919, he was a footballer for VTOPAS Moscow (All-Russian Society of Educational and Industrial Associations). He then he performed in clubs such as MOGES Moscow and FC Serp i Molot Moscow. In 1934 he moved to GCOLIFK football team. In 1941, upon the commencement of the Great Patriotic War he was forced to end his playing career. He defended the team colors of Moscow and the Russian Central Council of Trade Unions (VTSPS) (1931–1933).

In 1936 he coached the club Proletarskaya Pobeda Moscow. In June 1946 he was appointed head coach of Dynamo Kiev, with whom he worked until the end of the year. In the first half of 1948 he led Lokomotiv Moscow and in the second half of 1949, Dinamo Yerevan.  In 1950 he coached the club Krasnoye Znamya Ivanovo. From August until the end of 1968 he worked as the Director of Neftyanik Fergana. In the meantime, he was a consulting coach of the Albania national football team in 1948-1952. In the years 1943-1968 he worked intermittently as a senior manager in the Department of Sport Football Committee of the USSR. He was the author of The Technique of Football (1956, 1958), Tactical Preparation of Players (1961) etc. He died on February 27, 1975, in Moscow at the age of 69.

Apukhtin was awarded the title Master of Sports of the USSR in 1948 and the title of Merited Sports Coach of the USSR in 1957.

References

External links
 
 Profile on www.junik.lv 

1906 births
1975 deaths
People from Lyuberetsky District
People from Moskovsky Uyezd
Russian footballers
Soviet footballers
Soviet football managers
FC Dynamo Kyiv managers
FC Lokomotiv Moscow managers
FC Ararat Yerevan managers
Association football midfielders
Sportspeople from Moscow Oblast